Richard Imison (31 October 1936 – 9 February 1993) was Script Editor for BBC Radio Drama from 1963 to 1991.  In the thirty years that Imison worked for BBC Radio Drama it was the largest patron of original creative dramatic writing in Britain. In his role as Script Editor no other single individual therefore had as much influence in either the discovery of new talent or the encouragement of established writers such as Edward Albee, Ludmilla Petrushevskaya, Alexander Gelman, Harold Pinter and Samuel Beckett in the production of drama for this genre.

Richard Imison was key in setting up The Giles Cooper Awards in 1977, together with Geoffrey Strachan of the publishers Methuen. These lasted until the year after his death and were the premier celebration of dramatic writing for radio. They were named after the radio dramatist Giles Cooper whose work first appeared on BBC radio in 1949.

After his death in 1993 the Society of Authors established the Richard Imison Award in recognition of Imison's enduring influence on the development of high quality dramatic writing.

References 

1936 births
1993 deaths
Radio editors
BBC people
People from Birkenhead